Justin Barki (born 26 May 2000) is an Indonesian tennis player.

Barki has a career high ATP singles ranking of 1308 achieved on 19 June 2017 and a career high ATP doubles ranking of 403, achieved on 11 December 2017. Barki has won 5 ITF Futures doubles titles.

Barki has represented Indonesia at the Davis Cup.

Personal life
Barki is the cousin of racing driver Sean Gelael. He is the grandson of coal tycoon Kiki Barki, and the late Dick Gelael, the founder of Gelael Supermarket and Multi Food Indonesia.

Titles and finals

Tour doubles titles – all levels (6-2)

External links

2000 births
Living people
Indonesian male tennis players
Tennis players at the 2018 Asian Games
Asian Games competitors for Indonesia
Princeton Tigers men's tennis players
21st-century Indonesian people